Huka Kapo Glacier is a glacier from the plateau of the Willett Range in Victoria Land. It flows east, southward of Edbrooke Hill, and terminates nearly midway along the south side of the Apocalypse Peaks. Huka Kapo is a Māori word, meaning driving hail, and was applied descriptively to this glacier by the New Zealand Geographic Board in 2005.

References

Glaciers of Victoria Land
Willett Range